Toronto—High Park was a federal electoral district represented in the House of Commons of Canada from 1925 to 1935. It was located in the west end of the city of Toronto in the province of Ontario. This riding was created in 1924 from parts of Parkdale riding.

It was defined as consisting of the part of the city of Toronto west of Sunnyside Avenue, Howard Park Avenue, Indian Road, Bloor Street and Lansdowne Avenue, up to the Canadian Pacific Railway, and from there to the northern division of the Canadian National Railway, and from there to the north boundary of the city.

The electoral district was abolished in 1933 when it was redistributed between High Park, Parkdale, and York West ridings.

Electoral history

|- 
  
|Conservative
|ANDERSON, Alexander James 
|align="right"|15,809 
  
|Liberal
|MURDOCK, Hon. James
|align="right"| 5,465   
|}

|- 
  
|Conservative
|ANDERSON, Alexander James 
|align="right"| 12,366 
  
|Liberal
| MURDOCK, Hon. James  
|align="right"|4,167    
|}

|- 
  
|Conservative
|ANDERSON, Alexander James 
|align="right"| 11,807 
  
|Liberal
|BOND, Aubrey Albert 
|align="right"| 5,765   
|}

See also 

 List of Canadian federal electoral districts
 Past Canadian electoral districts

External links 

 Website of the Parliament of Canada

Former federal electoral districts of Ontario
Federal electoral districts of Toronto